Ashford is a constituency in Kent created in 1885 and represented in the House of Commons of the UK Parliament since 1997 by Damian Green, a Conservative who served as First Secretary of State between 11 June and 20 December 2017.

Constituency profile
The constituency includes all of Ashford, which is seeing significant housing expansion and has a manufacturing and services employment base; and surrounding rural areas including Tenterden and Wye. Residents' health and wealth are in line with UK averages. Due to population growth in Ashford itself, the 2023 boundary review proposes that Tenterden is removed from the Ashford constituency.

Boundaries

1885–1918: The Municipal Borough of Tenterden, the Sessional Divisions of Ashford and Cranbrook, the corporate towns of Lydd and New Romney, and part of the Liberty of Romney Marsh.

1918–1950: The Municipal Boroughs of Lydd, New Romney, and Tenterden, the Urban District of Ashford, and the Rural Districts of Cranbrook, East Ashford, Romney Marsh, Tenterden, and West Ashford.

1950–1974: The Municipal Borough of Tenterden, the Urban District of Ashford, and the Rural Districts of Cranbrook, East Ashford, Tenterden, and West Ashford.

1974–1983: The Municipal Borough of Tenterden, the Urban District of Ashford, and the Rural Districts of East Ashford, Tenterden, and West Ashford. Cranbrook Rural District was transferred to the new Royal Tunbridge Wells constituency.

1983–2010: The Borough of Ashford. The constituency boundaries remained unchanged from 1974.

2010–present: The Borough of Ashford wards of Aylesford Green, Beaver, Biddenden, Bockhanger, Boughton Aluph and Eastwell, Bybrook, Charing, Downs North, Downs West, Godinton, Great Chart with Singleton North, Highfield, Isle of Oxney, Kennington, Little Burton Farm, Norman, North Willesborough, Park Farm North, Park Farm South, Rolvenden and Tenterden West, St Michael's, Singleton South, South Willesborough, Stanhope, Stour, Tenterden North, Tenterden South, Victoria, Washford, Weald Central, Weald East, Weald North, Weald South, and Wye.

Ashford constituency has the large town of Ashford which has Ashford International railway station and the smaller town of Tenterden, one of the area's 46 villages, towns or town suburbs which are organised communities into civil parishes.  Ashford town centre, its north and its west are the only unparished areas.

Political history
Created under the Redistribution of Seats Act 1885, Ashford has been won by a Conservative at every election except that of 1929 when it was won by a Liberal, after that party's turn towards the left marked by the People's Budget in 1911, who won with a majority of less than 1% of the vote.

The most marginal victory since 1929 occurred in 1997 when its voters returned a Conservative who won by a 9.7% majority. The 2015 result made the seat the 106th safest of the Conservative Party's 331 seats by percentage of majority.

In June 2016, an estimated 60% of local adults voting in the EU membership referendum chose to leave the European Union instead of to remain. This was matched in two January 2018 votes in Parliament by its MP.

Members of Parliament
 Constituency created (1885)

Elections

Elections in the 2010s

Elections in the 2000s

Elections in the 1990s

Elections in the 1980s

Elections in the 1970s

Elections in the 1960s

Elections in the 1950s

Elections in the 1940s

Election in the 1930s

Election in the 1920s

Election results 1885–1918

Elections in the 1880s

Elections in the 1890s

Elections in the 1900s

Elections in the 1910s 

General Election 1914–15:

Another General Election was required to take place before the end of 1915. The political parties had been making preparations for an election to take place and by July 1914, the following candidates had been selected; 
Unionist: Lawrence Hardy
Liberal: Arthur Frederick William Johnson

See also
 List of parliamentary constituencies in Kent

Notes

References

Sources
 British Parliamentary Election Results 1885–1918, compiled and edited by F.W.S. Craig (Macmillan Press 1974)
 
 
 
 

Parliamentary constituencies in Kent
Parliament
Constituencies of the Parliament of the United Kingdom established in 1885